Jean-Pierre Fourcade (born 18 October 1929 in Marmande, Lot-et-Garonne) is a French politician and a member of the Senate of France. He represents the Hauts-de-Seine department and is a member of the Union for a Popular Movement Party. He is former minister for Economics and Finance (1974–1976), and equipment (1976–1981).

References
Page on the Senate website

1929 births
Living people
People from Marmande
Independent Republicans politicians
Union for French Democracy politicians
Democratic Convention (France) politicians
Union for a Popular Movement politicians
French Senators of the Fifth Republic
French Ministers of Finance
Senators of Hauts-de-Seine